Château d'Herbeys is an historic château in Herbeys, Isère, France. It was built in the 17th century. It has been listed as an official historical monument since December 14, 1949.

References

Houses completed in the 17th century
Châteaux in Isère
Monuments historiques of Isère